Khaira is a Census Town situated in the Palghar district of Maharashtra, India.

Demographics
According to the 2011 Indian Census, the total population of Khaira is 31,699 out of which 18,332 are males and 13,367 are females. The literacy rate of Khaira is 88.4 percent.

References

Cities and towns in Palghar district
Census towns in Maharashtra